Lamont is an unincorporated community and census-designated place (CDP) in Jefferson County, Florida, United States. As of the 2020 census,the population was 170.

Geography
Lamont is located on the eastern edge of Jefferson County at  (30.37694, -83.81306). It is bordered to the east by the Aucilla River, which forms the Madison County line.

U.S. Routes 19 and 27 run through the center of Lamont, leading southeast  to Perry and west  to Capps.

The Aucilla River, which runs along the eastern edge of the community, is a direct tributary of the Gulf of Mexico  to the south.

Ted Turner's  Avalon Plantation is located in Lamont.

Education
Jefferson County Schools operates public schools, including Jefferson County Middle / High School.

Demographics

References

Unincorporated communities in Jefferson County, Florida
Tallahassee metropolitan area
Unincorporated communities in Florida
Census-designated places in Florida